Paul Jesson (born 14 January 1955) is a retired New Zealand professional racing cyclist. Jesson became the first New Zealander to win a stage at a grand tour when he won Stage 10 of the 1980 Vuelta a España. 

Jesson's first professional race for Splendor was the 1979 Tour de France. This occurred because his team did not have enough riders to start.

In the prologue of the 1980 Critérium du Dauphiné Libéré Jesson hit a parked car resulting in a serious crash. He was admitted to hospital where he was unconscious for a week and had his leg amputated below the knee. Although the injury ended his professional racing career he did go on to win medals at the Paralympics

Major results
Sources:
1976
 1st  Overall Tour of Southland
 1st Overall Ster Van Henegouwen
1st Stage 7
1977
 2nd Overall Tour of Southland
1978
 1st  Overall Tour of Southland
 2nd Overall Tour de Wallonie
 2nd Overall Tour de Liège
1979
 4th Omloop van de Vlaamse Scheldeboorden
1980
 1st Stage 10 Vuelta a España
 2nd 
 3rd Nokere Koerse
1998
 1st  4000m Paralympic Pursuit World Championship
 1st  18km Time trial Paralympic World Championship
2004
 3rd  Summer Paralympics Road race/Time trial

Grand Tour results

References

External links

1955 births
Living people
New Zealand male cyclists
New Zealand Vuelta a España stage winners
Cyclists at the 2004 Summer Paralympics
Medalists at the 2004 Summer Paralympics
Paralympic medalists in cycling
Paralympic bronze medalists for New Zealand
Paralympic cyclists of New Zealand